Ernest Buckler  (19 July 1908 – 4 March 1984) was a Canadian novelist and short story writer best known for his 1952 novel, The Mountain and the Valley and the short story The first born Son.  "Since its publication in 1954, Ernest Buckler's story of David Canaan's life in the Annapolis Valley, The Mountain and the Valley, has gradually established itself as a touchstone of Canadian Modernism. Its continuing presence in Canadian Literature courses and its effect on such writers as Margaret Laurence and Alice Munro attest to its power as a novel exploring imaginative experience."  (Van Rys 1995)

Buckler was born in the village of West Dalhousie, Nova Scotia, where he attended a one-room schoolhouse. He was a scholarship student at Dalhousie University (B.A., 1929), and a philosophy student at  the University of Toronto (M.A., 1930).  After graduation, he stayed in Toronto, working as an actuary, until 1936, when he returned to rural Nova Scotia, eventually settling on a farm in Centrelea near Bridgetown.

In 1967, he was awarded the Canadian Centennial Medal and in 1974, he was made an Officer of the Order of Canada.

In 1978, he was awarded the Leacock Medal for Whirligig.

Bibliography

Novels
 The Mountain and the Valley. New York City: Henry Holt, 1952.
 The Cruelest Month, 1963.

Other works
 Ox Bells and Fireflies: A Memoir. Toronto: McClelland and Stewart, 1968; New York: Knopf, 1968.
 Nova Scotia: Window on the Sea. Toronto: McClelland and Stewart, 1973.
 The Rebellion of Young David and Other Stories. Toronto: McClelland and Stewart, 1975.
 Whirligig. Toronto: McClelland and Stewart, 1977.
 The Harness
 The Locket
 Penny in the Dust, 1927. 
 The Clumsy One
 The Bars and the Bridge
 Long, Long After School

References
 Lecker, Robert and Jack David. The Annotated Bibliography of Canada's Major Authors, volume III.

 Van Rys, John C.. Diminishing Voice in Buckler's The Mountain and the Valley. Studies in Canadian Literature, [S.l.], jan. 1995. ISSN 1718-7850.

External links
 

 Ernest Buckler at The Canadian Encyclopedia
 Ernest Buckler at The Literary Encyclopedia
 Ernest Buckler: A Remarkable Nova Scotia Novelist at Nova Scotia Archives & Records Management
 <http://journals.hil.unb.ca/index.php/SCL/article/view/8210/9267>. Date accessed: 15 Feb. 2015.

1908 births
1984 deaths
Writers from Nova Scotia
Canadian male novelists
University of Toronto alumni
Officers of the Order of Canada
Stephen Leacock Award winners
20th-century Canadian novelists
20th-century Canadian male writers
People from Annapolis County, Nova Scotia